Deborah Jane Marti (born 14 May 1968) is a former high jumper from England, who was born in Switzerland. She represented Great Britain at the Olympic Games in Barcelona 1992 and Atlanta 1996, finishing ninth in the 1992 final. She set her outdoor personal best of 1.94 metres, on 9 June 1996 at a meet in Tallinn. On 23 February 1997 in Birmingham, she cleared 1.95 metres to set a British indoor record, which stood for 17 years (1997–2014). She also won bronze medals at the 1983 European Junior Championships and the 1994 Commonwealth Games.

Career
Marti was born in Zofingen, Aargau, Switzerland and from the age of two, was raised in England. She was a member of Bromley Ladies Athletics Club. A prodigious talent, Marti cleared 1.81 m at the age of fourteen in 1982 before achieving 1.88 m at 15 in 1983 to win a European Junior Championships bronze medal. This still stands as a UK age 15 best. The following year she improved to 1.89 m and was unlucky not to earn selection for the 1984 Olympic Games. Her 1.89 m stood as a UK Under 17 record for 29 years until Morgan Lake cleared 1.90 m in 2013.

Marti's career was then slowed by the debilitating illness ME. She withdrew from the 1985 World Indoor Games. In 1986, she finished ninth in the final of the World Junior Championships. From 1985 – 1990, her best result was 1.86 m.

Marti returned to top form in 1991, when she improved her -year-old  PB to 1.94 during the indoor season, to equal Diana Davies's UK indoor record. She went on to clear 1.91 m to finish a fine fifth in the final at the World Indoor Championships in Seville. At the 1991 World Championships in Tokyo, she failed to reach the final, clearing 1.86 m in the qualifying round. In 1992, she competed at her first Olympic Games in Barcelona, where she achieved an outdoor PB of 1.92 m in the qualifying round before clearing 1.91 m for ninth in the final. She remained the last British woman to reach an Olympic high jump final until Morgan Lake qualified for the 2016 final in Rio. Shortly after the 1992 Games, she improved her outdoor best to 1.93 m.

Marti would continue as the UK's most consistent jumper for several years, although she was forced to withdraw from the 1993 World Championships due to injury. In 1994 she cleared 1.91 m to win a bronze medal at the Commonwealth Games in Victoria, Canada. In 1996, she achieved her lifetime outdoor best of 1. 94 m. She cleared this height in both Tallinn in June, then again in Birmingham in July, at the British Olympic Trials. At the Atlanta Olympics, she failed to reach the final with a best of 1.85 m, for 19th overall in qualification.

Marti reached her peak indoors in 1997, by clearing 1.95 m at the Birmingham indoor Grand Prix, to add one centimetre to the UK indoor record that she held jointly with Diana Davies and Jo Jennings. This height was also equal to the UK outdoor record. The record stood for 17 years, until Katarina Johnson-Thompson cleared 1.96 m on 8 February 2014. Also that year she reached the World Indoor Championship final in Paris and competed at the World Championships in Athens.

After a few low key years, Marti concluded her international career by finishing sixth at the 2002 Commonwealth Games in Manchester.

National titles
 4 AAA Championships (1991, 1993, 1996, 1997) 2nd (1994, 2002)
 3 UK Championships (1992, 1993, 1997) 2nd (1990, 1991)
 3 AAA Indoor Championships (1991, 1992, 1997) 2nd (1984, 1989, 1993, 1995, 1996, 1998, 1999)

International competitions

References

External links

1968 births
Living people
People from Zofingen
British female high jumpers
English female high jumpers
Olympic athletes of Great Britain
Athletes (track and field) at the 1992 Summer Olympics
Athletes (track and field) at the 1996 Summer Olympics
Commonwealth Games medallists in athletics
Commonwealth Games bronze medallists for England
Athletes (track and field) at the 1994 Commonwealth Games
Athletes (track and field) at the 2002 Commonwealth Games
World Athletics Championships athletes for Great Britain
Medallists at the 1994 Commonwealth Games